General elections were held in the Faroe Islands on 10 November 1920. The Union Party and the Self-Government Party both won 10 of the 20 seats in the Løgting.

Results

References

Elections in the Faroe Islands
Faroe Islands
1920 in the Faroe Islands
November 1920 events
Election and referendum articles with incomplete results